"Walk in the Light While There is Light" is a short story by Leo Tolstoy written in 1893.  According to famed Tolstoy-translators Louise Maude and Aylmer Maude, this story reflects Tolstoy's interest with early Christians, and according to translator Huntington Smith, this is a story about the early times of Christianity.

Aylmer Maude suggests that this story, and the ideas that inspired it, inspired the failed commune organized by followers of Tolstoy, Whiteway Colony. According to Maude, Tolstoy was ashamed of this story, partly because it portrayed bad heathens and good Christians as distinct groups when in reality they would have been mixed.

According to literary critic Malcolm Jones in a Cambridge University Press collection, this work is frequently recommended to aspiring Tolstoy scholars as seminal reading.

See also
 Bibliography of Leo Tolstoy

References

External links
 Original Text
 Walk in the Light While There is Light, from RevoltLib.com
 Walk in the Light While There is Light, from Marxists.org
 Walk in the Light While There is Light, from TheAnarchistLibrary.org

Short stories by Leo Tolstoy
1893 short stories